Allied Nations may refer to:

Allies, states allied in a common cause
Allies of World War I
Allies of World War II

In fiction
An international body in Mercenaries: Playground of Destruction
An international body in ''Street Fighter (1994 film)

See also
Allied Forces (disambiguation)
Allied Powers (disambiguation)